Triphleba is a genus of flies belonging to the family Phoridae.

The genus has almost cosmopolitan distribution.

Species:
 Triphleba admirabilis Schmitz, 1927 
 Triphleba aequalis Schmitz, 1919

References

Phoridae
Platypezoidea genera
Taxa named by Camillo Rondani